The 2015–16 Louisiana–Lafayette Ragin' Cajuns men's basketball team represented the University of Louisiana at Lafayette during the 2015–16 NCAA Division I men's basketball season. The Ragin' Cajuns, led by sixth year head coach Bob Marlin, played their home games at the Cajundome and were members of the Sun Belt Conference. They finished the season 19–15, 12–8 in Sun Belt play to finish in fourth place. They defeated South Alabama to advance to the semifinals of the Sun Belt tournament where they lost to Arkansas–Little Rock. They were invited to the CollegeInsider.com Tournament where they defeated Texas A&M–Corpus Christi and Furman to advance to the quarterfinals where they lost to UC Irvine.

Roster

Schedule

|-
!colspan=12 style="background:#E34234; color:#FFFFFF;"| Exhibition

|-
!colspan=12 style="background:#E34234; color:#FFFFFF;"| Regular season

|-
!colspan=12 style="background:#E34234; color:#FFFFFF;"| Sun Belt tournament

|-
!colspan=12 style="background:#E34234; color:#FFFFFF;"| CIT

References

Louisiana-Lafayette
Louisiana Ragin' Cajuns men's basketball seasons
Louisiana-Lafayette
Louisiana
Louisiana